Tenosique Municipality is a municipality in Tabasco in south-eastern Mexico. The municipal seat is the town of Tenosique.

Cañón del Usumacinta Flora and Fauna Protection Area is located in the municipality.

References

Municipalities of Tabasco